Acacia mariae, commonly known as golden-top wattle or  crowned wattle, is a species of wattle native to central New South Wales.

Description
It has smooth grey coloured bark with angled to terete branchlets that are densely haired. Like most species of Acacia it has phyllodes rather than true leaves. The whorled or clustered evergreen phyllodes have a narrowly elliptic to narrowly oblanceolate shape and are straight to slightly curved. It blooms between July and October producing simple inflorescences that occur singly in the axils. The spherical flower-heads have a diameter of  containing 22 to 38 bright yellow coloured flowers.

Taxonomy
The species was first formally described by the botanist Leslie Pedley in 2006 as part of the work "Notes on Acacia Mill. (Leguminosae: Mimosoideae), chiefly from Queensland" as published in the journal Austrobaileya. It is often confused with Acacia conferta. The specific epithet honours Mary Tindale who was once a botanist with the National Herbarium of New South Wales.

Distribution
It is found in central New South Wales on the eastern side of the Great Dividing Range from around Hillston and Katoomba in the south to around the Hunter Valley in the east mostly on the slopes and often in the Pilliga Scrub. It is often a part of dry sclerophyll woodland and mallee communities growing in sandy soils.

See also
List of Acacia species

References

mariae
Flora of New South Wales
Taxa named by Leslie Pedley
Plants described in 2006